Dafchah (also Romanized as Dāfchāh; also known as Katekūl-e Dāfchāh) is a village in Kateh Sar-e Khomam Rural District, Khomam District, Rasht County, Gilan Province, Iran. At the 2006 census, its population was 1,632, in 470 families.

References 

Populated places in Rasht County